WDKR (107.3 MHz) is a commercial FM radio station licensed to Maroa, Illinois, and serving the Decatur metropolitan area.  WDKR airs a radio format of oldies from the mid to late 1960s, the 1970s, and the early to mid 1980s.  The station is owned by WDKR, INC.

WDKR has an effective radiated power (ERP) of 3,000 watts.

References

External links
WDKR 107.3 Facebook

Oldies radio stations in the United States
DKR